The 2012 South American Under-17 Women's Football Championship was the third instance of the South American Under-17 Women's Football Championship. It was held from 9 to 25 March in Sucre and Santa Cruz, Bolivia. The top three teams qualified to the 2012 FIFA U-17 Women's World Cup held in Azerbaijan.

Hosts
Bolivia was awarded the tournament on 24 November 2011.

Venues

Group stage
Matches as of the regulations.
If teams are tied on points, the tiebreakers are in descending order: goal difference, goals scored, direct-matches between tied teams and finally the draw.

Group A
All Group A matches were played in Sucre.

Group B
All Group B matches were played in Santa Cruz.

Final round
The top two teams of each group played another round-robin. Brazil, Uruguay and Colombia qualified to the 2012 FIFA U-17 Women's World Cup in Azerbaijan.

Top scorers
9 goals
 Yamila Badell
8 goals
 Byanca Brasil
7 goals
 Brena Carolina
4 goals
 Dayana Castillo
 Carolina Birizamberri

The top-scorer award was handed to Yamila Badell from Uruguay who scored nine goals in her team's seven matches. Second place went to Brazilian Byanca Brasil who scored eight goals and third place to Brazilian Brena Carolina who scored seven times.

References

External links
Official website
CONMEBOL website 
Tourney at soccerway.com
Tourney at futbol24.com

2012
CON
Women
International association football competitions hosted by Bolivia
Women
2012 in youth sport
2012 in youth association football